Springdale Municipal Airport  is a public use airport in Washington County, Arkansas, United States. It is owned by the City of Springdale and located one nautical mile (2 km) southeast of its central business district. This airport is included in the National Plan of Integrated Airport Systems for 2011–2015, which categorized it as a general aviation facility.

Although most U.S. airports use the same three-letter location identifier for the FAA and IATA, this airport is assigned ASG by the FAA and SPZ by the IATA (which assigned ASG to Ashburton Aerodrome in Ashburton, New Zealand). The airport's ICAO identifier is KASG.

Facilities and aircraft 
Springdale Municipal Airport covers an area of 228 acres (92 ha) at an elevation of 1,353 feet (412 m) above mean sea level. It has one runway designated 18/36 with an asphalt surface measuring 5,302 by 76 feet (1,616 x 23 m).

For the 12-month period ending July 31, 2009, the airport had 62,450 aircraft operations, an average of 171 per day: 93% general aviation, 7% air taxi, and <1% military. At that time there were 97 aircraft based at this airport: 69% single-engine, 19% multi-engine, 4% jet, 4% helicopter, 3% ultralight, and 1% glider.

Fixed Base Operator and Training 
Springdale Municipal has one Fixed Base Operator at the west side of the airport. Summit aviation has fuel, snacks and clean bathrooms. The FBO building is also home to Flight Line Bar & Grill and ARH Flight training and aircraft services. ARH has Two c172's and Three helicopters available for training and general rental.

References

External links 
 Springdale Municipal (ASG) at the City of Springdale website
 Springdale Municipal (ASG) information from the Arkansas Department of Aeronautics
 Summit Aviation, the fixed-base operator (FBO)
 Aerial image as of February 2001 from USGS The National Map
 
 

Airports in Arkansas
Transportation in Washington County, Arkansas
Buildings and structures in Washington County, Arkansas
Springdale, Arkansas